Edwin Kempes (born 23 June 1976) is a retired Dutch tennis player, who had turned professional in 1995. Kempes reached his career-high ATP Tour singles ranking of world No. 98 in May 2001.

ATP career finals

Doubles: 1 (1 runner-up)

ATP Challenger and ITF Futures finals

Singles: 6 (4–2)

Doubles: 18 (11–7)

Performance timeline

Singles

External links
 
 
 

1976 births
Living people
Dutch male tennis players
Tennis players from Amsterdam
20th-century Dutch people